Temwaiku is a town and settlement in South Tarawa in Kiribati. It is part of a nearly continuous chain of settlements along the islands of South Tarawa, which are linked by causeways, in the same islet of Bonriki.

Temwaiku had 4,072 inhabitants at the last census (2015), making it the fourth most populated area in Kiribati and the third in South Tarawa Teinanano Urban Council (TUC), after Bikenibeu and Teaoraereke.

External links
Eduterre
Mindat
Tourist map of the settlement

Populated places in Kiribati
South Tarawa